Ithaca Roller Derby is a women's flat-track roller derby league based in Ithaca, New York. Founded in the fall of 2007, IRD is a member of the Women's Flat Track Derby Association (WFTDA).

History and organization
Initially known as the Ithaca League of Women Rollers, it was founded by the creation of the league's flagship team, the SufferJets. Named for local area ties to the woman's suffrage movement and the 1848 Woman's Rights Convention in Seneca Falls, IRD held its first home bout at Cass Park Rink in May 2008. The league experienced steady growth and formed a second team, the BlueStockings, in 2010.

IRD became a WFTDA Apprentice league in January 2011. In September 2011 they became a full member league of the Women's Flat Track Derby Association.

ILWR is now composed of two teams; the SufferJets serve as the league's A team and travel team in WFTDA-sanctioned play, and the BlueStockings are a B team which also competes against comparable teams from other leagues more locally. The SufferJets were voted the Ithaca Times Best Local Sports Team in 2010.

The league is also host to the Ithaca League of Junior Rollers (ILJR), Ithaca's youth league and the first junior roller derby league founded in New York State. These skaters range from ages 8–17 and are coached by skaters in ILWR. The Ithaca League of Junior Rollers is a member of the Junior Roller Derby Association, which uses a modified version of WFTDA rules and regulations. The league has two divisions, an open-division and a female only division. These youth had their exhibition bout in September 2010, only one year after the Junior Roller Derby Association was founded in Austin, Texas. Since its founding in 2010 ILJR has grown significantly in popularity along with ILWR.

WFTDA rankings

References

External links
 ILWR Official website
 "Roller Derby's Sisterhood," Smithsonian Magazine, October 2009.

Roller derby leagues in New York (state)
Ithaca, New York
Roller derby leagues established in 2007
2007 establishments in New York (state)